Gerhardus Petrus Engelbrecht (born 30 May 1991 in Pretoria, South Africa) is a South African rugby union player who most recently played with the  in the Rugby Challenge. His regular position is prop.

Career

Blue Bulls and UP Tuks

He joined the Blue Bulls Academy after high school and made eleven starts for the  side as they won the 2011 Under-21 Provincial Championship.

Falcons

He joined Kempton Park-based outfit  for the 2014 Currie Cup qualification tournament, a competition which saw the winner clinch a spot in the 2014 Currie Cup Premier Division.

The Falcons finished sixth in the qualification tournament to remain in the 2014 Currie Cup First Division. Engelbrecht was named in the Falcons squad for this tournament – where they eventually finished as runners-up – but failed to make any further appearances.

Sharks

In 2015, Engelbrecht was named in the  squad for the 2015 Currie Cup Premier Division.

References

South African rugby union players
Living people
1991 births
Rugby union players from Pretoria
Rugby union props
Falcons (rugby union) players
Sharks (Currie Cup) players